Mouri Syedan is located on Lehtrar Road in Rawalpindi District of Punjab, Pakistan. Mouri Syedan is famous for its turns, forests and streams.

The main language spoken is Pahari-Pothwari.

See also 
Neela Sandh Waterfall

References 

Populated places in Rawalpindi District
Tourist attractions in Punjab, Pakistan